Tang Tao (born May 1963) is a Chinese mathematician currently serving as President of BNU-HKBU United International College. Tang is a member of the Chinese Academy of Sciences. He is a fellow of the Society for Industrial and Applied Mathematics and American Mathematical Society.

Biography
Tang was born in May 1963 in Shucheng County, Anhui to a military family. He secondary studied at Beijing No. 9 High School. He completed his bachelor's degree in mathematics in 1984 from Peking University and earned his doctor's degree in mathematics from the University of Leeds in 1989. After graduation, he taught at Simon Fraser University and then obtained tenure there. In 1998, he moved to Hong Kong Baptist University, and became chair professor in 2003. He was Head of Department of Mathematics during 2005-2008, Director of Graduate School of the university from 2002-2011, Associate Vice-President of the university since 2009, and Dean of Science from 2011 to 2015. In May 2015, he was hired by the Southern University of Science and Technology as its vice-president. He was appointed Provost and VP Academic in May 2018.

Tang served one term as President of the East Asia SIAM Section. From 2008 to 2012, he served as the President of the Hong Kong Mathematical Society. Tang was the co-founding editor of a Chinese journal titled "Mathematical Culture", which offers lively, readable, and appealing exposition on a wide range of mathematical topics in four issues each year. Tang was also one of the authors for this journal, publishing several articles including Feng Kang's story and Yitang Zhang's story.

In November 2017, he was elected as an academician of the Chinese Academy of Sciences.

In February 2019, he has been appointed as the President of BNU-HKBU UIC.

Personal life
Tang has two sons and one daughter.

Selected works

Awards
 Leslie Fox Prize for numerical analysis, 1988
 Feng Kang Prize for Scientific Computing, 2003
 Fellow, Society for Industrial and Applied Mathematics (SIAM), 2012 
 State Natural Science Award, China, 2016
 Fellow of the American Mathematical Society, 2017 
 Member, Chinese Academy of Sciences
 Invited speaker, International Congress of Mathematicians, 2018

References

1963 births
People from Lu'an
Living people
Peking University alumni
Alumni of the University of Leeds
Chinese mathematicians
Academic staff of the Southern University of Science and Technology
Academic staff of Simon Fraser University
Academic staff of Hong Kong Baptist University
Members of the Election Committee of Hong Kong, 2021–2026